Throope Chapman (1738–1794) was one of the founders of Readsboro, Vermont, USA. He served with Thomas Knowlton as a member of Captain John Slapp's 8th Co, First Connecticut Regiment, during the Campaign of 1757 in the French and Indian War and also served in the Revolutionary War. He was a selectman in Readsboro through his death in 1794.

Notable descendants include Welcome Chapman.

References 

1738 births
1794 deaths
People from Ashford, Connecticut
People from Readsboro, Vermont
People of colonial Connecticut
American city founders
People of the French and Indian War
People of Vermont in the American Revolution